Martin Maloča (born 21 March 1990) is a Croatian footballer who plays for NK Lučko.

References

External links
 

1990 births
Living people
Footballers from Zagreb
Association football midfielders
Croatian footballers
NK Dubrava players
NK Sesvete players
Al-Faisaly FC players
HNK Gorica players
NK Lučko players
First Football League (Croatia) players
Saudi Professional League players
Croatian Football League players
Croatian expatriate footballers
Expatriate footballers in Saudi Arabia
Croatian expatriate sportspeople in Saudi Arabia